Michael Bruce Argo Smith (born 5 May 1980) is a South African cricketer. He played in 89 first-class, 72 List A, and 16 Twenty20 matches from 2003 to 2013.

References

External links 
 

1980 births
Living people
South African cricketers
Border cricketers
Eastern Province cricketers
Warriors cricketers
Sportspeople from Qonce